Yu Qiuli (15 November 1914 – 3 February 1999) was a Chinese Communist army officer and politician, general of the People's Liberation Army. A veteran of the Long March, he held top military and government positions under both Mao Zedong and Deng Xiaoping and is considered the founding father of the Chinese petroleum industry and the China National Petroleum Corporation.

Following military service as a senior commander and political commissar in the Second Sino–Japanese War and the Chinese Civil War, Yu then served as Minister of the Petroleum Industry (1958–1966), Chairman of the State Planning Commission (1970–1980), Vice Premier (1975–1982), and Deputy Secretary-General of the Central Military Commission as well as Director of the PLA General Political Department (in effect, responsible for ensuring the political loyalty of the entire PLA) from 1982 to 1987.

Early life and military service
Yu was born in Ji'an, Jiangxi, in 1914, three years after the collapse of China's last imperial dynasty, into a poor peasant family. By the age of 14 he had taken part in a peasant uprising. At 16 he joined the Chinese Communist Party. Yu was among the tens of thousands of guerrillas and their supporters who from 1934 joined the Long March in an effort to break through the Kuomintang blockades around the Communist base in the south. In 1936, he was injured in the arm during a skirmish with pursuing nationalist forces. He continued on the journey north over treacherous terrain. Nine months later, after he had completed a journey of thousands of miles in terrible pain, his arm was amputated. "I am a man who has gone through nine deaths," Yu told the American journalist Harrison Salisbury in 1984. 

From November 1936 to August 1937, he received advanced military and political training at the Counter-Japanese Military and Political University.

During the Second Sino-Japanese War of 1937–1945, he served as Director of the Political Department of the 358th Brigade and in the subsequent Chinese Civil War, as Commander and Political Commissar of the 1st Division of the 1st Field Army, he played a leading role in the capture of Qinghai.

Early People's Republic
After the Communist victory in 1949, Yu Qiuli was transferred to the Southwest, serving as a member of the Standing Committee of the Party Committee of the Western Sichuan District of the Communist Party of China and as the Principal and Political Commissar of the Senior Infantry School. In December 1954, he was called to Beijing and was named Director of the General Finance Department of the PLA, holding that position until early 1957, when he became Director of the PLA General Logistics Department. In September 1955, he was awarded the rank of lieutenant general.

Petroleum Industry
In February 1958, he became Minister for the Petroleum Industry, and decided to focus on oilfield exploration. This move thrust him into a far more prominent role in the Communist government. In the following year, the discovery of huge oil reserves in Daqing in the desolate wastes of north-eastern China gave him a mission that on its own would ensure his place in Communist China's history books. Yu's task was to turn Daqing into a model of Chinese industry. Under Yu's direction, the mosquito-infested marshland - in winter an expanse of ice - was transformed into China's biggest oil production centre. Daqing was written into the Communist lexicon as a name synonymous with proletarian heroism. It produced the famous Maoist icon Iron Man Wang, who, in order to stop a blow-out, leapt into a pool of liquid concrete to mix it using his own body. After his success in Daqing, Yu went on to establish several more major production centres. In 1964, China declared itself self-sufficient in oil. That year, Yu was moved into the most important government ministry related to the economy, the State Planning Commission, as deputy chief. 

In 1965, Mao made him the top drafter of the third Five Year Plan and put him in charge of relocating major industries to the remote hinterland of south-western China. Despite the claim of his official biographer that Yu suffered severe persecution during the tumultuous Cultural Revolution that began in 1966, he appears to have suffered less harm than many of his colleagues. In 1975, he was appointed Vice Premier, as was Deng Xiaoping. 

After the death of Mao in 1976, Yu was promoted to the ruling Politburo. He was a member of what is commonly referred to as the "petroleum faction", a group of senior officials who advocated using the profits from petroleum exports to finance high technology imports from the West and Japan. These officials were essentially Stalinists in their economic thinking, favoring central planning and heavy industry - a strategy that clashed with that of the ascendant Deng. As Deng's political fortunes rose in the late 1970s, those of the petroleum faction waned. Yu was forced to make a self-criticism after the collapse of a Japanese-made oil rig in the Bohai Gulf in 1979, and in 1980 he was transferred from the chairmanship of the State Planning Commission to the less high-profile post of head of the State Energy Commission.

Political overseer of the PLA
In 1982, however, Yu was back in uniform, as Deng named him Deputy Secretary-General of the Central Military Commission and Director of the PLA General Political Department, a position of massive influence in the PLA, being responsible for checking and ensuring the political reliability and loyalty of all military personnel, and often described as "Military Grand Inquisitor".

Yu held these posts until 1987, when he retired.

References

Bibliography
Salisbury, Harrison E. The New Emperors

External links
 on chinavitae.com
 on china.com.cn  
"Obituary: Yu Qiuli", The Independent, Feb 20, 1999  by James Miles

1914 births
1999 deaths
People of the Cultural Revolution
Members of the Secretariat of the Chinese Communist Party
People's Liberation Army generals from Jiangxi
People's Republic of China politicians from Jiangxi
Government ministers of the People's Republic of China
Politicians from Ji'an
State councillors of China
Members of the 12th Politburo of the Chinese Communist Party
Members of the 11th Politburo of the Chinese Communist Party
Chinese amputees
Chinese Communist Party politicians from Jiangxi
People of the Republic of China
Burials at Babaoshan Revolutionary Cemetery